Time Table is a 1956 American film noir crime film produced and directed by Mark Stevens, who also stars as the lead character.

The film includes early appearances by both Jack Klugman and Felicia Farr. She had earlier appeared (as Randy Farr) in Big House, U.S.A. (1955).

Plot
Paul Bruckner, a surgeon whose license has been revoked for alcoholism, poses as "Dr. Sloane" aboard a train passing through Arizona. His presence there is part of a caper involving a fictitious patient, on whose behalf he gains access to his physician's bag in the baggage car. There he blows the safe and steals a cash payroll of $500,000. Bruckner and the "patient," supposedly infected with polio, are let off at a remote small town with a hospital, which is also far from any scheduled train stop, and escape with the money in an ambulance. The railroad officials do not discover the robbery until the train reaches Phoenix, many hours later.

In response, the insurance company puts a claim investigator, Charlie Norman, on the case, forcing him to postpone his vacation to Mexico with his wife Ruth the next day. Joe Armstrong, a veteran railroad policeman who is also investigating the crime, works with him. Gradually evidence starts to turn up that the thieves stole the ambulance just before the robbery, then ditched it in the desert, escaping in a stolen helicopter. The scheme was thus elaborate, showing that the robbery had been carried out according to a strict timetable.
 
But there was one misstep that keeps it from being the perfect crime. During the escape the "patient," Lombard, accidentally shot himself, forcing Bruckner—and the money—to remain with him instead of escaping to Mexico, throwing off the timetable. Assigning Charlie to the case, a move by the insurance company unanticipated during planning of the crime, further disrupts the timetable. The audience learns that Charlie is the secret mastermind. Charlie carefully planned the crime after meeting Bruckner, who filed a false accident claim. Charlie plans to disappear in Mexico with Bruckner's wife Linda, who pretended to be Lombard's wife, and use the cash to finance his new life. Bruckner, desperate for money, joined in the crime strictly for the cash.

Charlie decides they should all wait for the investigation to cool off before trying to continue on to Mexico. However, Joe, methodically investigating each aspect of the crime, finds an accomplice, who leads to another, Wolfe, the owner of the "stolen" helicopter. Charlie realizes that Bruckner and Wolfe double-crossed him, killed Lombard and planned to keep the money for themselves. Charlie kills Wolfe to silence him and makes it appear to be a suicide. Bruckner, trying to escape to Mexico with Linda and his share of the loot, panics during a routine customs check and tries to force his way across the border, but is killed by police. Linda escapes, and Joe arranges to go with Charlie to Mexico to find her, believing she has the rest of the loot.

Charlie sees an opportunity to escape and stashes his cut of the money in a briefcase to smuggle into Mexico. He suspects Bruckner had already arranged to leave Mexico for another country with Linda. Charlie also discovers that an unsuspecting Ruth has tried to pull a practical joke on him by substituting fishing gear for his work reports in the briefcase. She has discovered the stolen money and returned it anonymously to the insurance company. While tracking down Linda to take Bruckner's place in the double-cross plan, Charlie draws the suspicion of Joe and the Mexican police, who close in. Forced to abandon Bruckner's plan, Charlie and Linda are cornered and killed in a shoot-out.

Cast

 Mark Stevens as Charlie Norman
 King Calder as Joe Armstrong
 Felicia Farr as Linda Bruckner
 Marianne Stewart as Ruth Norman
 Wesley Addy as Dr. Paul Bruckner
 Alan Reed as Al Wolfe
 Rodolfo Hoyos Jr. as Lt. Castro
 Jack Klugman as Frankie Page
 John Marley as Bobik

Reception
Film critic  Dennis Schwartz liked the film and wrote, "A gripping film noir about an ace insurance investigator, Charlie Norman (Mark Stevens—he also directs), who successfully plans a complicated train robbery in Arizona and ends up teamed with railroad detective Joe Armstrong (King Calder) as co-leaders of the investigation. The film's moralistic theme could be that there's no such a thing as a perfect crime, perfect marriage, or perfect job. It's a taut thriller with a fine script and acting ... This neat little suspense thriller had two noir themes going for it—the respected veteran insurance-agent-gone-wrong and the mid-life crisis of a conventional man who throws away a wife who loves him and his cozy but empty middle-class existence for a woman he lusts after. Mark Stevens, as the director, handled both themes rather well."

See also
List of American films of 1956
 List of films in the public domain in the United States

Notes

References

External links

 
 
 
 
 
 Time Table at Film Noir of the Week
  (public domain)

1956 films
1956 crime drama films
American black-and-white films
American crime drama films
Film noir
Films scored by Walter Scharf
Films set in Arizona
Films set in Mexico
Rail transport films
United Artists films
1950s English-language films
1950s American films